The Quarters are an Australian alternative rock band, formed in Melbourne in 2005. The band shot to fame in 2007 after they were chosen by Grinspoon to open a Melbourne music festival which included acts such as Grinspoon, The Butterfly Effect and Little Birdy. The Rock and Roll outfit is composed of Christopher James (vocals/guitar), Stephanie Jane (vocals/bass) and Braiden Mann (drums).

History
On 12 November 2005 The Quarters formed as a band in order to fill a vacancy in the Pakenham McDonald's’ McHappy Day Charity Show. A successful first public appearance ensured that when fans expressed interest in further performances Chris, Steph and previous drummer Ivan decided to continue the formation of their band.

After playing at iconic local venues such as 'The Castle' in Dandenong for most of 2006, The Quarters quickly gained praised by those in the music industry for their unique sound and attitude. The Quarters were requested to perform at various other venues across Melbourne in early 2007 which led to various interviews on music shows on Channel 31.

However, The Quarters real big break came after they won a competition held by internationally renowned band Grinspoon to unearth Australia's next big thing in Rock music. As part of their prize, The Quarters won the opportunity to perform at the 2007 Breakout Festival in Melbourne alongside Grinspoon and various other international acts  such as The Butterfly Effect and Little Birdy. Their unearthing led to widespread media coverage across Australia including national television appearances consisting of an interview on Channel V

Following the success of their performance at the Breakout Festival, The Quarters were invited to support Operator Please, Airbourne and The Getaway Plan on their tours down the east coast of Australia in late 2007 and early 2008. It has been confirmed from sources that in November 2008, The Quarters will be supporting the internationally renowned band You Am I at a performance in Melbourne.

In 2011 The Quarters released a new EP entitled "Tik Tik Boom" and is now available for purchase at their website. Following the release of the EP, and departure of Ivan Rogic, Chris, Steph and new drummer Alex Hingston and are set to being their "East Coast Tour"

Live performances

References

External links
Official The Quarters Myspace page
Triple J Unearthed
KoolSkools newsletter

Australian indie rock groups
Musical groups established in 2005